Donald L. Taylor (January 30, 1915 – May 4, 1987) was an American politician who served in the New York State Assembly from 1966 to 1976.

He died on May 4, 1987, in Watertown, New York at age 72.

References

1915 births
1987 deaths
20th-century American politicians
Republican Party members of the New York State Assembly